Torann Maizeroi (born 1 April 1989 in Fort-de-France, Martinique) is a French taekwondo practitioner.  In the July 2015 World Taekwondo Federation world rankings, Maizeroi was ranked 6th in the -74 kg division.

References

External links
 

1989 births
Living people
French male taekwondo practitioners
Taekwondo practitioners at the 2015 European Games
European Games competitors for France
Universiade medalists in taekwondo
Universiade silver medalists for France
Universiade bronze medalists for France
European Taekwondo Championships medalists
Medalists at the 2007 Summer Universiade
Medalists at the 2009 Summer Universiade
Medalists at the 2015 Summer Universiade